Live is the final album by fusion band Return to Forever. It was recorded live at the Palladium in New York City on May 20 and 21 1977 as part of the Musicmagic tour to support the album of the same name. This was the only tour to feature the Musicmagic (1977) lineup, which included original members Chick Corea, Stanley Clarke, and Joe Farrell, along with newly added member, Chick Corea's wife, Gayle Moran on vocals, piano and organ, and a six-piece horn section.

Originally released as a single LP, the album was re-issued in 1978 as a four LP set called Return to Forever Live: The Complete Concert, which contained the full concert as heard by those who attended, including extended sections of dialogue and audience applause.

Release history 
The original release was a single LP with a cover featuring Picasso's Three Musicians.  A greatly expanded version of the album was released in 1978 on four LPs as Return to Forever Live: The Complete Concert, showcasing the entire two-hour-and-forty-minute concert. This Complete Concert release features a plain dark blue cover with a stylized 'RTF' logo and contains the entireties of pieces that had been edited down for the original one LP release, including a version of "Spanish Fantasy"; the intro to which was previously released in edited form as "Chick's Piano". Also included are spoken introductions to songs by Stanley Clarke, including one in which he is heckled by the audience for announcing the concert's final piece.

In June 2011 Columbia (Sony) released a five CD boxed set, Return to Forever, The Complete Columbia Albums Collection which includes the entire 1977 Live: The Complete Concert recording on three CDs together with 1976's Romantic Warrior and 1977's Musicmagic studio albums.

In September 2011 the three CD version Return to Forever Live: The Complete Concert, 3-Record Set was released in Japan as a Blue-Spec CD limited boxset reproducing the original Japanese 1978 four LP boxset. However, this 2011 reissue features "The Endless Night" and "Musicmagic" as one track each, instead of the original splits and fades of each song.

Track listing 
All songs written and composed by Chick Corea, except where noted.

Live

Live: The Complete Concert – original vinyl pressing (1978)[4LP]

Live: The Complete Concert (US, 1992)[2CD]

Live: The Complete Concert – 3 Record Set (Japan, 1993)[3CD]

Live: The Complete Concert – 3 Record Set (Japan, 2011)[3CD]

Personnel 
 Chick Corea – Steinway grand piano, Fender Rhodes electric piano, Hohner clavinet, Yamaha electric organ, synthesizers (ARP Odyssey, Minimoog, Moog 15 modular, Oberheim 8-voice), effects MXR Digital Delay, vocals
 Gayle Moran – Hammond B3 organ, Yamaha electric piano, Mellotron, Synthesizer [Minimoog], vocals
 Joe Farrell – piccolo flute, flute, soprano saxophone, tenor saxophone
 James Tinsley – piccolo trumpet, trumpet, flugelhorn
 John Thomas – piccolo trumpet, trumpet, flugelhorn
 Jim Pugh – lead tenor trombone, baritone horn
 Ron Moss – tenor trombone
 Harold Garret – bass trombone, baritone horn, tuba
 Stanley Clarke – Alembic electric bass, acoustic bass, vocals
 Gerry Brown – drums

Chart performance

References 

 Columbia 35281 (1 LP, 1978) at Discogs
 Columbia C4X 35350 (4 LPs, 1978) at Discogs
 Legacy C2K 47479 (2 CDs, 1992, USA) at Discogs
 Columbia 468923 2 (2 CDs, 1992, Europe) at Discogs
 Sony Records (J) SRCS 7142 2 (3 CDs, 1993, Japan) at Discogs
 Sony Records (J) SICP-20305~7 (3 CDs, 2011, Japan) at Discogs

External links 
 Return to Forever - Live (1978) album releases & credits at Discogs
 Return to Forever - Live (1978) album credits & user reviews at ProgArchives.com
 Return to Forever - Live: Complete Concert (1978, Remastered 1992, 2CD) album review, credits & releases at AllMusic
 Return to Forever - Live: Complete Concert (1978) album releases & credits at Discogs
 Return to Forever - Live: The Complete Concert (1978) album credits & user reviews at ProgArchives.com
 Return to Forever - Live: The Complete Concert (1978, Remastered 1992, 2CD) album to be listened as stream on Spotify
 Return to Forever - The Complete Columbia Albums Collection (2011, 5CD Box Set Compilation) album releases & credits at Discogs

Return to Forever albums
Live jazz fusion albums
1978 live albums
Columbia Records live albums